Grigoriy Yemets (born 8 October 1957) is a Ukrainian former track and field athlete who competed in the triple jump for the Soviet Union.

This was the best indoor performance that year. It stood as the championship for only two years, as fellow Soviet Māris Bružiks cleared  to win the title in 1986.

He was chosen to represent the Soviet Union at the Friendship Games, but managed only eighth place. His highest global ranking was ninth, in the 1983 season, and after 1985 he dropped out of the global top 25.

International competitions

See also
List of European Athletics Indoor Championships medalists (men)

References

External links



Living people
1957 births
Ukrainian male triple jumpers
Soviet male triple jumpers